Fally Mayulu (born 15 July 2002) is a French professional footballer who plays as a forward for Austrian club BW Linz.

Club career
Mayulu passed through the academies of Epinay and Entente SSG before joining Lens. After three years with Lens, he went on trial with Paris Saint-Germain, but would ultimately end up joining German side VfL Wolfsburg.

In February 2022, Mayulu joined Austrian side BW Linz.

International career
Mayulu is eligible to represent France and the Democratic Republic of the Congo at international level.

Personal life
Mayulu's brother, Senny, is also a footballer, and plays for the youth sides of Paris Saint-Germain.

Career statistics

Club

Notes

References

2002 births
Living people
French footballers
French people of Democratic Republic of the Congo descent
Association football forwards
Regionalliga players
2. Liga (Austria) players
Entente SSG players
RC Lens players
VfL Wolfsburg players
VfL Wolfsburg II players
FC Blau-Weiß Linz players
French expatriate footballers
French expatriate sportspeople in Germany
Expatriate footballers in Germany
French expatriate sportspeople in Austria
Expatriate footballers in Austria